Alimamy Sesay (born April 24, 1987) nicknamed Orkomie, is a Sierra Leonean international footballer currently playing as a midfielder for East End Lions in the Sierra Leone National Premier League, the top football league in Sierra Leone.

Profile
Sesay, commonly known by his nickname Orkomie was born and raised in Bo, the second largest city in Sierra Leone, to Temne parents. Between 2001 and 2003, Sesay was rated as one of the best teenage footballers in Sierra Leone. He joined top Sierra Leonean football club Kallon in 2001 at the age of 16. During his first season in the Sierra Leone National Premier League, he was named the best young player in the league under the age of 23 and among the best players overall. Sesay helped Kallon win their first Premier League championship in the 2006 season and also played for them in the 2006-2007 CAF Champions League.

Playing career
2003-2008 Kallon F.C.
2009–2018 East End Lions

International career
Sesay was a key player for the Sierra Leone under-17 team that took second place behind Cameroon at the 2003 African Under-17 Championship tournament held in Swaziland. He also played in all three games for Sierra Leone at the 2003 FIFA U-17 World Championship in Finland. He made his senior international debut for Sierra Leone on October 7, 2006, when the Leone Stars were defeated 2-0 in Benin in a 2008 African Nations Cup qualifier.

External links
 

1987 births
Sierra Leonean footballers
Living people
Sportspeople from Freetown
Temne people
Association football midfielders
Sierra Leone international footballers